Jacques Marie Alfred Dufresne (1822, Orléans – 18 March 1863, Paris) was a 19th-century French composer and playwright.

A student of Fromental Halévy at the Paris Conservatory, he is mostly known for having written music for hundreds of songs by authors such as Jules Verne, Alfred de Musset, Alphonse de Lamartine or Victor Hugo.

He also composed operettas and opéras comiques including L'hôtel de la poste on a libretto by Philippe Gille.

Works 
1851: La Chèvre perdue, poem by Lebaigue
1851: Heureuse !, mélodie, poem by Gustave de Penmarch
1853: La Chanson de Fortunio, poem by Alfred de Musset
1853: Reflets de Printemps, poem by de Penmarch
1853: Sérénade, poem by Victor Hugo
1853: Les Soirées d'automne, twelve melodies
1854: La Colombe, poem by de Penmarch
1854: Album de 10 mélodies, lyrics by Eugène de Lonlay
1854: L’Écho du lavoir !, ditty, lyrics by Eugène de Lonlay
1854: Écoute, poem by de Penmarch
1854: L’Étoile, melody, lyrics by de Penmarch
1854: La Fiancée du timbalier, poem by Victor Hugo
1854: Le Grillon, melody, poem by Alphonse de Lamartine
1854: Hélas !, poem by Lamartine
1854: Oh ! batteux battons la gerbe !, chant rustique
1854: Pendant l'orage, cavatine
1854: Le Sommeil des fleurs, melody, poem by de Penmarch
1854: Villanelle, poem by Adrien Decourcelle
1855: Les Chants intimes, collection of melodies and romances
1855: En avant les zouaves !, chanson guerrière, poem by Jules Verne
1855: Sous la tonnelle, poem by de Penmarch, n°2 for tenor or soprano
1856: Venant de Pontoise, one-act operetta, lyrics by Eugène Mestépès
1857: La Fileuse, rêverie, lyrics by Anne Kerhalet
1857: Les Voix dans l'air, rêverie, lyrics by de Penmarch
1858: Adieu paniers vendanges sont faites, song, lyrics by de Penmarch
1858: Maître Baton, one-act operetta, lyrics by Eugène Bercioux
1860: Les valets de Gascogne, one-act opéra comique, with Philippe Gille
1861: A L'île de la Jamaïque, Haitian melody, poem by Pierre Faubert
undated: Chants intimes, mater doforosa, poem by Charles Lebaigue
undated: Dieu bénit tout le monde, romance, lyrics by Lebaigue
undated: Les Muguets blancs, melody, poem by Émile Lecygne
undated: L'hôtel de la poste, one-act operetta, with Philippe Gille
undated: La Veillée !, lyrics by Villemontez, music by Pierre Gaveaux, chanson d'autrefois, transcrite et arrangée à 2 voix

Bibliography 
 Bulletins de la Société des compositeurs de musique, 1863, (p. 26) (obituary) (Read online)
 Pierre Larousse, Nouveau Larousse illustré: dictionnaire universel, 1898, (p. 870)
 Florian Bruyas, Histoire de l'opérette en France, 1855-1965, 1974, (p. 55)
 Frédéric-Gaël Theuriau, L'univers musical de Jules Verne, actes de la conférence du samedi 21 mai 2005, auditorium de la Bibliothèque municipale de Tours, 2004

References

External links 
 Alfred Dufresne on data.bnf.fr

French operetta composers
19th-century French dramatists and playwrights
1822 births
Musicians from Orléans
1863 deaths
French male classical composers
19th-century French male musicians
Writers from Orléans